Hyeong may refer to:

 Hyeong (형(形)) Korean Martial arts forms. As such, it may also refer to:
 Teul (martial arts) (틀)
 Pumsae (품새; 品勢)